Wine.com is an American wine online retailer that offers the largest selection of wines in the world.  Wine.com sells over 2 million bottles per year, with a stock of more than 17,000 different bottles of wine, shipping throughout the United States.

History

The company now known as Wine.com was originally founded as Virtual Vineyards by Robert Olson in Los Altos, California in 1994 with co-founders Master Sommelier Peter Granoff, and Information Architect Harry Max. Virtual Vineyards sold its first bottle of wine online via its custom-coded, secure, on-line shopping cart January 24, 1995 and went into full production a couple of weeks later. The current Wine.com business was founded by Mike Osborn in Portland, Oregon as eVineyard in 1998. In 1995, David Harmon founded wine.com and in 1999 sold the information site Wine.com to Virtual Vineyards for over $10,000,000. In 2000, VirtualVineyards.com and WineShopper.com merged under the Wine.com moniker. In the spring of 2001, eVineyard purchased the assets of the combined business prior to their bankruptcy and became known as Wine.com. After being acquired, Wine.com moved its corporate offices to San Francisco, CA. In 2006, Rich Bergsund joined Wine.com as CEO, seeing the company through a financial turnaround. According to Internet Retailer, the company has grown to become the biggest online wine retailer in the United States. Wine.com is majority owned by Baker Capital, a New York–based private equity firm.

In 2010, Wine.com launched WineShopper, a members-only website owned and operated by Wine.com. WineShopper is an "online flash sales site that features deals on limited quantities of wine for up to 72 hours."

Mobile Applications
 In December 2009, Wine.com launched an iPhone application developed by Wine.com's iPad app developer-partner Marshall Monroe Magic.
In November 2010, Wine.com launched an iPad application, featuring a dashboard to view thousands of wine labels, including an interactive geo-location tour of where the wine was produced.
In November 2011, Wine.com released a mobile site.

References

External links
http://wine.com/

1998 establishments in Oregon
Companies based in San Francisco
American companies established in 1998
Retail companies established in 1998
Internet properties established in 1998
Online retailers of the United States
Wine retailers
Drink companies of the United States